Bidens lemmonii (Lemmon's beggarticks) is a North American species of flowering plant in the family Asteraceae. It is native to the southwestern United States (Arizona, New Mexico) and Mexico (Sonora, Chihuahua, Durango, Sinaloa, Michoacán, Baja California, Baja California Sur).

Bidens lemmonii is an annual herb up to 30 cm (12 inches) tall. It produces flower heads sometimes one at a time, sometimes in a group of several, each containing yellow disc florets and (usually) white ray florets. The species grows in wet seeps on rocky mountainsides.

The species is named for John Gill Lemmon (1831 or 32-1908), husband of American botanist Sara Plummer Lemmon (1836–1923).

References

External links
SEINet, Southwestern  Biodiversity, Arizona Chapter, Bidens lemmonii A. Gray

lemmonii
Flora of Arizona
Flora of New Mexico
Flora of Northwestern Mexico
Plants described in 1884
Taxa named by Asa Gray